Attercliffe railway station  was built to serve the Parish of Attercliffe cum Darnall, then separated from but now part of the City of Sheffield, South Yorkshire, England.

The station was situated on the Manchester, Sheffield and Lincolnshire Railway company's line between Woodburn Junction and Tinsley Junction which was served by trains between Sheffield Victoria, Barnsley and Rotherham Central. Access to the station was by a footpath from Worksop Road. At the station's opening this was the main road between Attercliffe (it left the main Sheffield-Rotherham road opposite the parish church), and Darnall. The station consisted of two platforms flanking the lines and these were linked by a subway.

History

The original station was opened in August 1871, closed on 31 December 1900 and replaced by a new structure which opened the following day. The station was closed on 26 September 1927 but is remembered by the "Station Hotel" on Attercliffe Road, a short distance away which had, and may still have, a fine pictorial sign depicting a station porter at work on the station.

MSLR was renamed  the Great Central Railway in 1897. It became part of the London and North Eastern Railway during the Grouping of 1923. Attercliffe Station closed four years later.

Earthworks of the station platforms are still visible as is the subway, now bricked-up, from the towpath of the Sheffield Canal alongside which the railway runs.

References

 

Attercliffe
Disused railway stations in Sheffield
Railway stations in Great Britain opened in 1871
Railway stations in Great Britain closed in 1927
Former Great Central Railway stations
1871 establishments in England
1927 disestablishments in England